Ma Shouzhen (c. 1548–1604), also known by her courtesy name Ma Xianglan (meaning "Orchid of the Xiang River") and pen name Yuejiao ("Lunar Beauty"), was a Chinese courtesan and artist born in Nanjing during the late Ming dynasty (1550–1644). She was a renowned painter, poet, and composer. She received the name Xianglan because her most favored paintings were of orchids.

Biography 
Ma was born in Nanjing, and she lived in the entertainment district along the Qinhuai River. As a matriarch in courtesan society, she encouraged the education and training of courtesans in the arts. In order to maintain her reputation as an elite courtesan, she only allowed educated men or young student lords within her residence.

During the late Ming dynasty, elite courtesans challenged the gender stereotypes of Confucian values. In contrast to the women of the gentry, who were often discouraged from cultivating talent lest it undermine their virtue as wives and mothers, courtesans were educated in painting, poetry, and music. In addition, they owned property and participated in the public scene.

At the age of 15, Ma Shouzhen formally assumed the position of courtesan. Before this, she may have received education from a proprietor who owned her during her childhood. As courtesan matriarch, she befriended many poets and intellects such as Peng Nian (1505–1566), Zhou Tianqiu (1514–1595), Xu Wei (1521–1593), Xue Mingyi (late 16th century), and Wang Zhideng (1535–1612). The poets would write poems inspired by her or for her, describing Ma as beautiful with a warm and welcoming personality. During their visits, Ma Shouzhen joined them in making paintings, poems, and plays. She also hosted parties on her multi-leveled house-boat with the literati as her guests.

Romance with Wang Zhideng 
Ma Shouzhen and Wang Zhideng shared a loving relationship with one another, and there are instances in which the two openly expressed their affection for each other. They wrote letters to each other, collaborated in several paintings and poem. One of their famous collaborations was Narcissus and Rock, which consists of two images and a poem. When Ma published her poems in 1591, Wang included a preface for them. On one occasion, Ma took her house-boat to see Wang in Suzhou and celebrated his 70th birthday with a party of musicians. Not long after this, Ma fell ill and died peacefully in her residence in Nanjing. Wang wrote several eulogies of Ma after her death.

Paintings and Poetry 
As a painter, Ma Shouzhen is well known for landscapes, orchids, and bamboo imagery combined with calligraphy. Her brush work is delicate, and the images have either colors lightly applied or monochromatic ink. Her preferred painting formats include fan, hand-scrolls, and hanging scrolls.
Along with painting, Ma was skilled in writing poetry and composing dramas, however, some of her dramas have been lost over time. The only paintings by Ma Shouzhen that survive today are her ink landscapes, orchids, and bamboo. Since she was a social person, many of her paintings may have been given away at parties.

List of Works 
 Orchid and Bamboo, (fan) ink on golden paper, in the Palace Museum Collection
 Orchid, Bamboo, and Rock, (fan) ink on golden paper, in the Palace Museum Collection
 Orchid, Bamboo, and Rock, (hand-scroll) ink on golden paper, in the Palace Museum Collection
 Orchid and Rock, (hanging scroll) ink on paper, in the Metropolitan Museum of Art Online Collection

Gallery

References

Further reading

External links 
 Palace Museum Collection
 Art Net
 Metropolitan Museum of Art Collection

1540s births
1644 deaths
Year of birth uncertain
Chinese women painters
Ming dynasty painters
16th-century Chinese women
16th-century Chinese people
16th-century Chinese women artists
17th-century Chinese people
16th-century Chinese painters
16th-century Chinese poets
Chinese composers
Eight Beauties of Qinhuai
16th-century Chinese women singers
Women theatre managers and producers